Indooroopilly Shopping Centre (formerly Indooroopilly Shoppingtown, colloquially Indro) is a major regional shopping centre in the western suburb of Indooroopilly in the City of Brisbane, Queensland, Australia. It hosts over 300 specialty stores over 4 floors and is the largest shopping centre in the western suburbs of Brisbane, by gross lettable area, and contains the only Myer and David Jones store in that region.

History

The centre was constructed and opened in 1970 by The Westfield Group. The entire area was first cleared of the residents and their homes, mostly Queenslander-style houses. At its opening, it was reputedly the largest shopping mall in the Southern Hemisphere. This title has since been overtaken by newer centres such as the Chadstone Shopping Centre in Victoria.

The centre has undergone extensive renovations since its opening. Some of these include a 12 screen cinema complex operated by Birch Carroll and Coyle Megaplex in 1998. Until 2000, Indooroopilly Shopping Centre was known as Westfield Shoppingtown Indooroopilly.

In 2000, The Westfield Group sold its 50% joint venture stake in the centre to Commonwealth Funds Management (CFM) for $300 million. CFM, through its management of the Commonwealth Property Fund (CPF), was the other partner in the joint venture, owning the other 50% stake and giving them full ownership of the centre as a result of the sale. In 2005, CPF (while managed by Colonial First State Property) sold 50% of the centre to the Public Sector and Commonwealth Superannuation Schemes (PSS/CSS)and local business owner Michael Schirripa. Indooroopilly Shopping Centre is owned by Commonwealth Superannuation Corporation and is managed by Eureka Funds Management as Investment Manager.

A $450 million redevelopment was completed in 2014 including a David Jones store, a revitalised Myer store, a new Coles supermarket to join Woolworths and a new outdoor dining precinct. 120 new specialty stores, including Australian and international fashion brands, were added taking the total number of specialty stores to 360.

The centre introduced an advanced parking system in September 2015. The new parking system (the first in a Queensland shopping centre) is ticketless relying on license plate recognition. As a part of the controlled parking initiative, a parking guidance system has been introduced using LED-based space indicators and electronic display boards to advise customers of available car parking spaces.

Retailers

Indooroopilly Shopping Centre is home to a large number of retail shops and hosts many fashion stores. Majors include Myer, David Jones, Target, Kmart, Coles, Woolworths, Aldi, Rebel, JB Hi-Fi, H&M, Uniqlo, Sephora, Cotton On Mega and Daiso. Indooroopilly Shopping Centre has a 16 screen Event cinemas and large food court at the southern end of the 3rd level, which includes a McDonald’s and a KFC.

Transport
The shopping centre is well serviced by public and private transport. Indooroopilly Shopping Centre contains the bus interchange that acts as a hub for bus services in the western suburbs. The Indooroopilly railway station is located 400m downhill from the shopping centre. Extensive car parks, with access from all sides of the shopping centre provide convenient access for cars. Bicycle racks are provided around the entrances to the shopping centre. The centre's pedestrian access is via 3 direct entrances are located on the building's ends; all other entrances are via the car parks.

Other facilities
Indooroopilly Shopping Centre contains an office tower, housing a number of professional suites, such as health-care, accounting, and others. The centre is home to the Indooroopilly branch of the Brisbane City Council Library and contains an Australia Post office. There are also branches for Bupa and Medibank Private.  Medical service include two three medical centres, two audiology clinics, a dentist and a podiatrist. Also contained within the centre is the Indooroopilly Police Beat.

See also

List of shopping centres in Australia

References

External links

 Official Shopping Centre Website
 

Shopping centres in Brisbane
Former Westfield centres in Australia
Shopping malls established in 1970
Indooroopilly, Queensland
1970 establishments in Australia